Ernest Brown Babcock (July 10, 1877 – December 8, 1954) was an American plant geneticist who pioneered the under

standing of plant evolution in terms of genetics. He is particularly known for seeking to understand by field investigations and extensive experiments, the entire polyploid apomictic genus Crepis, in which he recognize 196 species. He published more than 100 articles and books explaining plant genetics, including the seminal textbook (with Roy Elwood Clausen) Genetics in Relation to Agriculture.  He instructed Marion Elizabeth Stilwell Cave.

References

Publications
 Carey, C.W. 2000. Babcock, Ernest Brown. American National Biography Online. Oxford University Press

External links 

1877 births
1954 deaths
American geneticists
Modern synthesis (20th century)
University of California, Berkeley people